Brainwash Projects is a hip hop group formed by LA Symphony members Pigeon John and . The duo released their first album The Rise and Fall of (Brainwash Projects) on Jackson Rubio.

Releases
Ride the Dolphin EP (Unreleased demo) (Circa 1995)
The Rise and Fall of Brainwash Projects (1998)

American hip hop groups
Musical groups from California
1994 establishments in California
Musical groups established in 1994